Richard Penn Sr. (17 January 1706 – 4 February 1771) was a proprietary and titular governor of the province of Pennsylvania and the counties of New Castle, Kent, and Sussex (which three now comprise the state of Delaware) on the Delaware River from 1746 to 1771. His father was Founder of Pennsylvania William Penn.

Life 
Born in Bristol, England, Penn was the third son of William Penn, founder of Pennsylvania, and his second wife Hannah Margaret Callowhill. He married Hannah, daughter of John Lardner, and had two sons, John and Richard, both of whom also served as provincial governors of Pennsylvania.

On 12 May 1732, Penn with his brothers John and Thomas as the proprietors of Pennsylvania, signed an order to create a commission. This order was directed to Governor Gordon, Isaac Norris, Samuel Preston, James Logan, and Andrew Hamilton, Esquires, and to the gentlemen James Steel and Robert Charles. The commission, which was to be made up of at least three or more of these individuals, was given full power on behalf of the proprietors for the "running, marking, and laying out" of any boundary between Pennsylvania and Maryland. This was in accordance to the agreement signed between the Penn brothers and Charles Calvert, 5th Baron Baltimore on 10 May 1732.

Penn died in England on 4 February 1771.

Notes

References 

Attribution

1706 births
1771 deaths
Businesspeople from Bristol
Colonial governors of Pennsylvania
English people of Welsh descent
People of colonial Pennsylvania
Richard Sr.